The Mayor of Yerevan is head of the executive branch of Yerevan's government. The mayor is elected by the Yerevan City Council. Recent city council elections took place in 2018, 2017 and 2013.

List of mayors

References

External links 
 List and photographs of mayors on the Yerevan official website

Yerevan
Yerevan, mayors

Mayors